Datano is town located in the Amansie South District in the Ashanti Region of Ghana. It shares boundary with Tontokrom. It is known for the Manso-Datano United Friends Association. In 2017, a GHȼ350,000.00 air-conditioned washroom facility was awarded to improve sanitation in the town. Datano is the most populous, and industrious town with the highest number of people in the Amansie South District.

References 

Populated places in the Ashanti Region